Resende is a municipality in the Viseu District in Portugal. The population in 2011 was 11,364, in an area of 123.35 km2.

The present mayor is Manuel Garcez Trindade, elected by the Socialist Party. The municipal holiday is September 29.

Demographics

Parishes

Administratively, the municipality is divided into 11 civil parishes (freguesias):
 Anreade e São Romão de Aregos
 Barrô
 Cárquere
 Felgueiras e Feirão
 Freigil e Miomães
 Ovadas e Panchorra
 Paus
 Resende
 São Cipriano
 São João de Fontoura
 São Martinho de Mouros

Famous people
Edgar Cardoso (1913 in Resende – 2000 in Porto) a noted civil engineer and university professor.

References

External links
Municipality official website
Photos from Resende
Felgueiras (Resende) website
Resende News

 
Towns in Portugal
Populated places in Viseu District
Municipalities of Viseu District